Elazığ Airport  is an airport in Elazığ, Turkey. First opened to air traffic in 1940, Elazığ Airport is one of the oldest airports still in use in Turkey. The old runway 09/27 had been closed and has been removed. New 13/31 runway is installed at 2021 build the second runway at Elazığ Airport. A new terminal building and runway has also been built in 2012. New runway is 07/25. The old terminal and runway are taken over by the Turkish Armed Forces.

Airlines and destinations
The following airlines operate regular scheduled and charter flights at Elazığ Airport:

Traffic Statistics

References

External links
 
 

Airports in Turkey
Buildings and structures in Elazığ Province
Transport in Elazığ Province
Elazığ